This is a list of diseases that affect the genus Peperomia.

Fungal diseases

Viral diseases

References
Common Names of Diseases, The American Phytopathological Society

Peperomia diseases